Bryllupsfotografen is a 1994 Norwegian drama film directed by Johan Bergenstråhle, starring Kurt Ravn and Ilse Rande. Daniel Svare (Ravn) is an accomplished photographer and a socially engaged documentary film maker, who experiences a mid-life crisis. He leaves his wife and children to start up as a wedding photographer in his old home town, but his past catches up with him.

External links
 
 Bryllupsfotografen at Filmweb.no (Norwegian)

1994 films
1994 drama films
Norwegian drama films
1990s Norwegian-language films